Just Like a Woman is a 1992 British comedy-drama film directed by Christopher Monger starring Julie Walters, Adrian Pasdar, and Paul Freeman. The film is based on the 1985 novel Geraldine, For the Love of a Transvestite by Monica Jay, and is one of the few "cross-dressing" films in which the hero is actually a transvestite, therefore having pure intentions, unlike Some Like it Hot, Tootsie, Mrs. Doubtfire, and others in which the cross-dresser has an ulterior motive. Just Like A Woman was adapted for screen and produced by Nicholas Evans. It was a modest commercial and critical success.

Plot
Gerald Tilson, a finance executive, finds himself thrown out by his wife when she discovers women's underwear in their flat; in fact the clothes belong to him. He takes lodgings with Monica, who gradually discovers his alter ego, "Geraldine". A subplot deals with his boss' plan to defraud their Japanese clients, and how the couple thwart it.

Cast
 Julie Walters as Monica
 Adrian Pasdar as Gerald Tilson/Geraldine
 Paul Freeman as Miles Millichamp
 Susan Wooldridge as Louisa
 Gordon Kennedy as C.J.
 Ian Redford as Tom Braxton
 Shelley Thompson as Eleanor Tilson
 Togo Igawa as Akira Watanabe
 Jill Spurrier as Daphne
 Corey Cowper as Erika Tilson
 Mark Hadfield as Dennis
 Joseph Bennett as Jocelyn

Production
The film's title is taken from the song "Just Like a Woman" by Bob Dylan.

See also
 Transgender in film and television
 Cross-dressing in film and television

References

External links
 
 
 
 Article about the book Gerald/ine at OutPost Press

1992 films
1992 comedy-drama films
1992 independent films
1992 LGBT-related films
British comedy-drama films
British independent films
British LGBT-related films
British satirical films
Cross-dressing in film
Films directed by Christopher Monger
Films based on British novels
Films shot at Pinewood Studios
LGBT-related comedy-drama films
The Samuel Goldwyn Company films
1990s English-language films
1990s British films